Jeanne Hersch (13 July 1910 – 5 June 2000) was a Swiss philosopher of Polish-Jewish origin, whose works dealt with the concept of freedom. She was the daughter of Liebman Hersch.

Education and career 
Hersch was born in 1910 in Geneva, Switzerland. She later studied under the existentialist Karl Jaspers in Germany in the early 1930s. She taught French, Latin and Philosophy in the International School of Geneva, the world's first international school, for 33 years (1933-1956).

From 1942 to 1946, she participated in the doctoral colloquium of the philosopher Paul Häberlin, the predecessor of Karl Jaspers, at the University of Basel. Häberlin's Lucerna Foundation supported her doctoral thesis with a scholarship.

In 1956, she was appointed to a professorship at the University of Geneva, one of the first women to hold such a post at a Swiss university, holding the post until 1977. From 1966 to 1968 she headed the philosophy division of UNESCO, and was a member of its executive commission from 1970 to 1972.

In 1968 she edited Le droit d'être un homme, une anthologie mondiale de la liberté in French (translated in English in 1969 as Birthright of Man: A Selection of Texts and also in Greek as Το δικαίωμα να είσαι άνθρωπος), an anthology of writings on human rights, republished in French in 1984 and 1990.

In 1987, she received the Einstein Medal.

Bibliography

 Emmanuel Dufour-Kowalski Présence dans le Temps, L'Âge d'Homme Editions, Lausanne, 1999.

References

External links
Biography and her works

1910 births
2000 deaths
20th-century Swiss philosophers
Albert Einstein Medal recipients
Jewish philosophers
Swiss human rights activists
Swiss Jews
Swiss women philosophers
Writers from Geneva
People associated with the University of Basel